American singer and songwriter P!nk has won 3 Grammy Awards, 7 MTV Video Music Awards, 7 Billboard Music Awards and 5 World Music Awards. Her songs are characterized by their personally rebellious tone and a statement-like strict use of the first person. Pink has released 9 albums, Can't Take Me Home, Missundaztood, Try This, I'm Not Dead, Funhouse, Greatest Hits... So Far!!!, The Truth About Love, Beautiful Trauma, and Hurts 2B Human. Her second studio album, Missundaztood, was released in 2001, and was successful worldwide and made her a worldwide known singer. She won numerous awards, including 3 Grammy Awards. Pink has been nominated a total of 215 times and has won 131 times.

ACM Awards
The Academy of Country Music Awards is the oldest awards in country music. Pink was nominated one time.

! scope="col" |
|-
| style="text-align:center;"|2017
| style="text-align:center;"|Setting the World on Fire ft. Kenny Chesney
| style="text-align:center;"|Vocal Event of the Year
|
|
|-

ALMA Awards
The ALMA Awards is an awards ceremony organized by the National Council of La Raza to recognize outstanding American Latino in the entertainment industry. Pink has won two awards from two nominations.

! scope="col" |
|-
| style="text-align:center;" rowspan="2"| 2002 || Live at the 43rd Grammy Awards || Outstanding Performance in a Music, Variety or Comedy Special ||  || style="text-align:center;"|
|-
| "Lady Marmalade" || Outstanding Song in a Motion Picture Soundtrack ||  || style="text-align:center;"|
|-

American Music Awards
The American Music Awards show is one of several annual major American music awards shows (among the others are the Grammy Awards, the MTV Video Music Awards etc.). Pink has been nominated eight times.

! scope="col" |
|-
| style="text-align:center;"|2001
| rowspan="2" style="text-align:center;"|Pink
| style="text-align:center;"|Favorite Soul/R&B New Artist
|
|-
| rowspan="2" style="text-align:center;"|2003
| style="text-align:center;"|Favorite Pop/Rock Female Artist
|
|-
| style="text-align:center;"|Missundaztood
| style="text-align:center;"|Favorite Pop/Rock Album
|
|-
| rowspan="2" style="text-align:center;"|2013
| rowspan="4" style="text-align:center;"|Pink
| style="text-align:center;"|Favorite Pop/Rock Female Artist
|
|-
| rowspan="3" style="text-align:center;"|Favorite Adult Contemporary Artist
|
|-
|2018
|
|-
| rowspan="2" style="text-align:center;"|2019
|
| rowspan="2" style="text-align:center;"|
|-
|Beautiful Trauma World Tour
| style="text-align:center;"|Tour of the Year
|
|}

AOL Instant Messenger Best Musical Buddy Award
The AOL Instant Messenger Best Musical Buddy Award was given by AOL with the public voting on which musical artist they would most like on their instant messenger buddy list. P!nk received the award in 2006.

APRA Awards (Australia)
The APRA Awards (Australia) are annually held by Australasian Performing Right Association to honor outstanding music artists and songwriters of the year.

! scope="col" |
|-
| style="text-align:center;"|2010
| style="text-align:center;"|"Sober"
| style="text-align:center;"|International Work of the Year
|
|
|-
| style="text-align:center;"|2019
| style="text-align:center;"|"What About Us"
| style="text-align:center;"|International Work of the Year
|
|

ARIA Music Awards
The ARIA Music Awards are presented annually by the Australian Record Industry Association to recognize achievements in the Australian music industry. Pink has received one awards from four nominations.

! Lost to
! scope="col" |
|-
| style="text-align:center;"|2011
| Pink
| rowspan="4" style="text-align:center;"|Best International Artist
|
|
|
|-
| style="text-align:center;"|2013
| The Truth About Love
|
|One Direction - Take Me Home 
|
|-
| style="text-align:center;"|2018
| Beautiful Trauma
|
|Camila Cabello - Camila
|
|-
| style="text-align:center;"|2019
| Hurts 2B Human
|
|Taylor Swift - Lover
|

Billboard Music Awards
The Billboard Music Awards, sponsored by Billboard magazine was one of several annual United States music awards shows (among the others are the Grammy Awards, the American Music Awards and the Rock and Roll Hall of Fame Induction Ceremony). Pink has received 4 awards from 11 nominations.

|-
| rowspan="3" style="text-align:center;"|2000
| rowspan="3" style="text-align:center;"|Pink
| style="text-align:center;"|New Female Artist of the Year
|
|-
| style="text-align:center;"|Female Hot 100 Singles Artist
|
|-
| style="text-align:center;"|Female Artist	of the Year
|
|-
| rowspan="2" style="text-align:center;"|2002
| style="text-align:center;"|Missundaztood
| style="text-align:center;"|Billboard 200 Album of the Year
|
|-
| rowspan="2" style="text-align:center;"|Pink
| style="text-align:center;"|Female Artist of the Year
|
|-
| style="text-align:center;"|2014
| style="text-align:center;"|Top Touring Artist
|
|-
| rowspan="2" style="text-align:center;"|2017
| rowspan="2" style="text-align:center;"| "Setting the World on Fire" (ft. Kenny Chesney)
| style="text-align:center;"| Top Country Song
|
|-
| style="text-align:center;"| Top Country Collaboration
|
|-
| style="text-align:center;"|2018
| style="text-align:center;"|Beautiful Trauma
| style="text-align:center;"| Top Selling Album
| 
|-
| style="text-align:center;"|2020
| rowspan="2" style="text-align:center;"|Pink
| style="text-align:center;"|Top Touring Artist
|
|-
| style="text-align:center;"|2021
| style="text-align:center;"|Icon Award
|
|}

Billboard Women in Music
The Billboard Women in Music is an annual event held by Billboard. Its main award is titled Woman of the Year, established to recognize "women in the music industry who have made significant contributions to the business and who, through their work and continued success, inspire generations of women to take on increasing responsibilities within the field".

|-
| style="text-align:center;"|2013
| style="text-align:center;"|Pink
| style="text-align:center;"|Woman of the Year
|

Billboard Music Video Awards
Pink has received one awards from two nominations.

|-
| rowspan="2" style="text-align:center;"|2001
| rowspan="2" style="text-align:center;"|"Lady Marmalade"
| style="text-align:center;"|Director of the Year
|
|-
| style="text-align:center;"|Best Dance Clip of the Year
|

Billboard Live Music Awards
The Billboard Live Music Awards is an annual meeting sponsored by Billboard magazine that honors the top international live entertainment industry artists and professionals. Pink has received three awards from five nominations.

|-
| rowspan="3" style="text-align:center;"|2013
| rowspan="3" style="text-align:center;"|Pink
| style="text-align:center;"|Top Draw
|
|-
| style="text-align:center;"|Top Boxscore
|
|-
| style="text-align:center;"|Eventful Fans' Choice Award
|
|-
| style="text-align:center;"|2019
| style="text-align:center;"|Beautiful Trauma World Tour
| style="text-align:center;"|Tour of the Year
|
|-
| style="text-align:center;"|2019
| style="text-align:center;"|Pink
| style="text-align:center;"|Legend of Live
|
|-

Blockbuster Entertainment Awards
Pink has received one award from one nomination.

! scope="col" |
|-
| style="text-align:center;"|2001
| style="text-align:center;"|Pink
| style="text-align:center;"| Favorite Female – New Artist 
|
|

BMI Awards
Broadcast Music Incorporated (BMI) is one of three United States performing rights organizations, along with ASCAP and SESAC. Pink has received four awards from four nominations.

! scope="col" |
|-
| rowspan="2" style="text-align:center;"|2008
| style="text-align:center;"|"U + Ur Hand"
| rowspan="2" style="text-align:center;"|BMI Pop Awards
|
| rowspan="2" style="text-align:center;"|
|-
| style="text-align:center;"|"Who Knew"
|
|-
| 2015
| style="text-align:center;"|Herself 
| style="text-align:center;"|BMI President's Award
| 
| style="text-align:center;"|
|-
| 2020
| style="text-align:center;"|Walk Me Home
| style="text-align:center;"|BMI Pop Awards
| 
| style="text-align:center;"|

Brit Awards
The Brit Awards, often simply called The Brits and stylized as The BRIT Awards, are the British Phonographic Industry's annual pop music awards. Pink has received two awards from nine nominations.

|- 
| rowspan="2" style="text-align:center;"|2001
| rowspan="2" style="text-align:center;"|Pink
| style="text-align:center;"|Best International Female Solo Artist
|
|- 
| style="text-align:center;"|Best International Newcomer
|
|-
| rowspan="3" style="text-align:center;"|2003
| style="text-align:center;"|Missundaztood
| style="text-align:center;"|Best International Album
|
|-
| rowspan="7" style="text-align:center;"|Pink
| style="text-align:center;"|Best Pop Act
|
|-
| rowspan="5" style="text-align:center;"|Best International Female Solo Artist
|
|-
| style="text-align:center;"|2007
|
|-
| style="text-align:center;"|2009
|
|-
| style="text-align:center;"|2014
|
|-
| style="text-align:center;"|2018
|
|-
| align=“center”|2019
| align=“center”|Outstanding Contribution to Music
|

British LGBT Awards

! scope="col" |
|- 
| style="text-align:center;"|2018
| style="text-align:center;"|Pink
| style="text-align:center;"|Music Artist
|
|
|-

Channel V Thailand Music Video Awards

Country Music Association Awards

CMT Music Awards
The CMT Music Awards is an annual ceremony held in Nashville, Tennessee, dedicated exclusively to honor country music videos. It was established in 1967, and had several names throughout the years. In 2002, it was moved to Country Music Television and, in 2005, was renamed CMT Music Awards. 

!
|-
! scope="row"|2017
| style="text-align:center;"|"Setting the World on Fire" (with Kenny Chesney)
| Collaborative Video of the Year
|
| style="text-align:center;"|
|-

Echo Awards

!
|-
||2018
|| Pink
| Best Female International Artist
|
| style="text-align:center;"|
|}

Fonogram Awards
Fonogram Awards is the national music awards of Hungary, held every year since 1992 and promoted by Mahasz.

! scope="col" |
|-
| style="text-align:center;"|2004
| style="text-align:center;"|Try This
| style="text-align:center;"|Pop Album of the Year
| 
|
|-
| style="text-align:center;"|2013
| style="text-align:center;"|The Truth About Love
| style="text-align:center;"|Pop/Rock Album of the Year
| 
|
|-
| style="text-align:center;"|2018
| style="text-align:center;"|«What About Us»
| style="text-align:center;"|Pop-Rock Album or Voice Recording of the Year
| 
|
|-

GAFFA Awards

GAFFA Awards (Denmark) 
Delivered since 1991, the GAFFA Awards are a Danish award that rewards popular music by the magazine of the same name.

!
|-
| 2006
| Herself
| Best Foreign Female Act
| 
| style="text-align:center;" |
|}

GAFFA Awards (Sweden)
Delivered since 2010, the GAFFA Awards (Swedish: GAFFA Priset) are a Swedish award that rewards popular music awarded by the magazine of the same name.

!
|-
| 2018
| Herself
| Best Foreign Solo Act
| 
| style="text-align:center;" |
|}

Gay and Lesbian Entertainment Critics Association (GALECA) 

! scope="col" |
|-
| style="text-align:center;"|2018
| style="text-align:center;"|"Beautiful Trauma"
| style="text-align:center;"|Dorian Award for TV Musical Performance of the Year
| 
|
|-

Girls Choice Awards 

! scope="col" |
|-
| rowspan="2" style="text-align:center;"|2019
| style="text-align:center;"|"Love Me Anyway" (featuring Chris Stapleton)
| style="text-align:center;"|Most Empowering Song of the Year (Group or Duo)
| 
| rowspan="2" style="text-align:center;"|
|-
| style="text-align:center;"|"Try" 
| style="text-align:center;"|Most Empowering Girl Power Anthem of the Decade
|

Global Awards
The Global Awards are held by leading media & entertainment Global groups which include Capital, Capital XTRA, Heart, Classic FM, Smooth, Radio X, LBC and Gold. The first award ceremony take place at London's Eventim Apollo on March 1, 2018.

! scope="col" |
|-
| rowspan="3" style="text-align:center;"|2018
| style="text-align:center;"|"What About Us"
| style="text-align:center;"|Best Song
| 
| rowspan="3" style="text-align:center;"|
|-
| rowspan="2" style="text-align:center;"|Pink
| style="text-align:center;"|Best Female
| 
|-
| style="text-align:center;"|Mass Appeal Award
| 
|-
| style="text-align:center;"|2020
| style="text-align:center;"|"Walk Me Home"
| style="text-align:center;"|Best Song
| 
| style="text-align:center;"|
|-

Grammy Awards
The Grammy Awards or Grammys are presented annually by the National Academy of Recording Arts and Sciences of the United States for outstanding achievements in the music industry. Pink has received three awards from twenty-one nominations (four of them as a featured artist).

|-
| style="text-align:center;"| 2002 || "Lady Marmalade" (with Christina Aguilera, Lil' Kim and Mýa)|| Best Pop Collaboration with Vocals || 
|-
| style="text-align:center;" rowspan="2"| 2003 || "Get the Party Started" || Best Female Pop Vocal Performance || 
|-
| Missundaztood || Best Pop Vocal Album || 
|-
| style="text-align:center;" rowspan="2"| 2004 || "Feel Good Time" || Best Pop Collaboration with Vocals || 
|-
| "Trouble" || Best Female Rock Vocal Performance || 
|-
| style="text-align:center;"| 2007 || "Stupid Girls" || rowspan="3" | Best Female Pop Vocal Performance || 
|-
| style="text-align:center;"| 2009 || "So What" || 
|-
| style="text-align:center;" rowspan="2"| 2010
| "Sober"
| 
|-
| Funhouse
| Best Pop Vocal Album 
| 
|-
| style="text-align:center;" rowspan="2"| 2011 || "Imagine" (with Herbie Hancock, India.Arie, Seal, Konono Nº1, Jeff Beck and Oumou Sangaré)||Best Pop Collaboration with Vocals || 
|-
| Recovery (as featured artist)
| Album of the Year
| 
|-
| style="text-align:center;"| 2012 ||"Fuckin' Perfect" || Best Pop Solo Performance || 
|-
| style="text-align:center;"| 2013 || The Truth About Love || Best Pop Vocal Album || 
|-
| style="text-align:center;" rowspan="2"| 2014 || rowspan="2"| "Just Give Me a Reason" (featuring Nate Ruess) || Song of the Year || 
|-
| Best Pop Duo/Group Performance || 
|-
| style="text-align:center;"| 2015 || The Truth About Love Tour: Live from Melbourne || Best Music Film || 
|-
| style="text-align:center;" rowspan="2"| 2017
|| "Just Like Fire" || Best Song Written for Visual Media || 
|-
| "Setting the World on Fire" (with Kenny Chesney)
| Best Country Duo/Group Performance
| 
|-
| style="text-align:center;"|2018
|"What About Us"
|| Best Pop Solo Performance
|
|-
||2019
|Beautiful Trauma
|Best Pop Vocal Album
|
|-
||2022
|"All I Know So Far"
|Best Song Written for Visual Media
|
|-

Guild of Music Supervisors Awards

! scope="col" |
|-
| style="text-align:center;"|2017
| style="text-align:center;"|Just Like Fire
| style="text-align:center;"|Best Song/Recording Created for a Film
|
|

Helpmann Awards
The Helpmann Awards recognise distinguished artistic achievement and excellence in Australia's live performing arts sectors. Pink has received one award.

! scope="col" |
|-
| style="text-align:center;"|2004
| style="text-align:center;"|Try This Tour
| style="text-align:center;" rowspan="2"|Best International Contemporary Concert
|
|
|-
| style="text-align:center;"|2010
| style="text-align:center;"|Funhouse Tour
|
|

Hollywood Music in Media Awards

! scope="col" |
|-
| style="text-align:center;"|2016
| style="text-align:center;"|Just Like Fire
| style="text-align:center;"|Best Original Song - Sci-Fi/Fantasy Film
|
|

Hollywood Walk of Fame

|-
|2019
|P!nk
|Hollywood Walk of Fame
|
|}

iHeartRadio Music Awards 

! scope="col" |
|-
| style="text-align:center;"|2017
| style="text-align:center;"|"Just Like Fire"
| style="text-align:center;"|Best Song from a Movie
|
|
|-
| style="text-align:center;"|2018
| style="text-align:center;"|Pink
| style="text-align:center;"|Female Artist of the Year
|
|
|-
| style="text-align:center;"|2019
| style="text-align:center;"|"A Million Dreams"
| style="text-align:center;"|Best Cover Song
|
|
|-

iHeartRadio Titanium Awards 
iHeartRadio Titanium Awards are awarded to an artist when their song reaches 1 Billion Spins across iHeartRadio Stations.

International Dance Music Award
The International Dance Music Awards were established in 1985. It is a part of the Winter Music Conference, a weeklong electronic music event held annually. Pink has been nominated once.

! scope="col" |
|-
| style="text-align:center;"|2009
| style="text-align:center;"|"So What"
| style="text-align:center;"|Best Pop Dance Track
|
|
|-

Juice TV Awards

Juno Awards
The Juno Awards are presented annually to Canadian musical artists and bands to acknowledge their artistic and technical achievements in all aspects of music. New members of the Canadian Music Hall of Fame are also inducted as part of the awards ceremonies.

! scope="col" |
|-
| style="text-align:center;"|2014
| style="text-align:center;"|The Truth About Love
| style="text-align:center;"|International Album of the Year
|
|
|}

LOS40 Music Awards

! scope="col" |
|-
| rowspan="2" style="text-align:center;"| 2013
| style="text-align:center;"|The Truth About Love
| style="text-align:center;"| Best International Album 
|
| rowspan="2" style="text-align:center;"|
|-
| style="text-align:center;"| Pink
| style="text-align:center;"| Best International Act
|
|}

Meteor Music Awards
The Meteor Ireland Music Awards are the national music awards of Ireland. They have been held every year since 2001 and are promoted by MCD Productions. Pink has been nominated once.
 

! scope="col" |
|-
| style="text-align:center;"|2009
| style="text-align:center;"|Pink
| style="text-align:center;"|Best International Female
|
|

MTV Awards

MTV Australia Awards
The MTV Australia Awards started in 2005 and is Australia's first awards show to celebrate both local and international acts. Pink has received four awards from six nominations.
 

|-
| rowspan="4" style="text-align:center;"|2007
| style="text-align:center;"|"U + Ur Hand"
| style="text-align:center;"|Best Pop Video
|
|-
| style="text-align:center;"|I'm Not Dead
| style="text-align:center;"|Album of the Year
|
|-
| style="text-align:center;"|Pink
| style="text-align:center;"|Female Artist of the Year
|
|-
| style="text-align:center;"|"Who Knew"
| style="text-align:center;"|Download of the Year
|
|-
| style="text-align:center;"|2008
| style="text-align:center;"|I'm Not Dead Tour
| style="text-align:center;"|MTV Live Performer Award
|
|-
| style="text-align:center;"|2009
| style="text-align:center;"|"So What"
| style="text-align:center;"|Best Video
|

MTV Europe Music Awards
The MTV Europe Music Awards (EMA) were established in 1994 by MTV Networks Europe to celebrate the most popular music videos in Europe. Pink has received two awards from nine nominations.
 

|-
| style="text-align:center;"|2001
| style="text-align:center;"|"Lady Marmalade"
| style="text-align:center;"|Best Song
|
|-
| rowspan="4" style="text-align:center;"|2002
| style="text-align:center;"|"Get the Party Started"
| style="text-align:center;"|Best Song
|
|-
| rowspan="2" style="text-align:center;"|Pink
| style="text-align:center;"|Best Pop
|
|-
| style="text-align:center;"|Best Female
|2013
|-
| style="text-align:center;"|Missundaztood
| style="text-align:center;"|Best Album
|
|-
| rowspan="2" style="text-align:center;"|2003
| rowspan="2" style="text-align:center;"|Pink
| style="text-align:center;"|Best Female
|
|-
| style="text-align:center;"|Best Pop
|
|-
| style="text-align:center;"|2006
| style="text-align:center;"|"Stupid Girls"
| style="text-align:center;"|Best Video
|
|-
| rowspan="2" style="text-align:center;"|2008
| rowspan="2" style="text-align:center;"|"So What"
|-
| style="text-align:center;"|Most Addictive Track
|
|-
| rowspan="2" style="text-align:center;"|2012
| rowspan="2" style="text-align:center;"|Pink
| style="text-align:center;"|Best Female
|
|-
| style="text-align:center;"|Worldwide Act North American
|
|-
| style="text-align:center;"|2013
| rowspan="3" style="text-align:center;"|Pink
| rowspan="3" style="text-align:center;"|Best Live 
|
|-
| style="text-align:center;"|2018
|
|-
| style="text-align:center;"|2019
|

MTV Video Music Awards Latinoamérica
MTV Video Music Awards Latinoamérica is the Latin American version of the Video Music Awards. They were established in 2002 to celebrate the top music videos of the year in Latin America and the world. Pink has been received one award.
 

|-
| style="text-align:center;"|2002
| style="text-align:center;"|Pink
| style="text-align:center;"|Best Pop Artist — International
|
|-

MTV Movie Awards
The MTV Movie Awards is a film awards show presented annually on MTV. The nominees are decided by producers and executives at MTV. Winners are decided online by the general public.

|-
| style="text-align:center;"|2004
| style="text-align:center;"|Pink / Charlie's Angels: Full Throttle
| style="text-align:center;"|Best Cameo
|

MTV Video Music Awards
The MTV Video Music Awards is an annual awards ceremony established in 1984 by MTV. Pink has received seven awards from twenty one nominations.
 

|-
| style="text-align:center;"|2000
| style="text-align:center;"|"There You Go"
| style="text-align:center;"|Best New Artist in a Video
|
|-
| rowspan="6" style="text-align:center;"|2001
| rowspan="6" style="text-align:center;"|"Lady Marmalade"
| style="text-align:center;"|Video of the Year
|
|-
| style="text-align:center;"|Best Pop Video
|
|-
| style="text-align:center;"|Best Video from a Film
|
|-	
| style="text-align:center;"|Best Dance Video
|
|-
| style="text-align:center;"|Best Choreography in a Video
|
|-
| style="text-align:center;"|Best Art Direction in a Video
|
|-
| rowspan="3" style="text-align:center;"|2002
| rowspan="3" style="text-align:center;"|"Get The Party Started"
| style="text-align:center;"|Best Female Video
|
|-
| style="text-align:center;"|Best Pop Video
|
|-
| style="text-align:center;"|Best Dance Video
|
|-
| style="text-align:center;"|2006
| style="text-align:center;"|"Stupid Girls"
| style="text-align:center;"|Best Pop Video
|
|-
| style="text-align:center;"|2009
| style="text-align:center;"|"So What"
| style="text-align:center;"|Best Female Video
|
|-
| rowspan="2" style="text-align:center;"|2010
| rowspan="2" style="text-align:center;"|"Funhouse"
| style="text-align:center;"|Best Direction
|
|-
| style="text-align:center;"|Best Editing
|
|-
| style="text-align:center;"|2011
| style="text-align:center;"|"Fuckin' Perfect"
| style="text-align:center;"|Best Video with a Message
|
|-
| rowspan="3" style="text-align:center;"|2013
| rowspan="3" style="text-align:center;"|"Just Give Me a Reason" (featuring Nate Ruess)
| style="text-align:center;"|Best Female Video
|
|-
| style="text-align:center;"|Best Collaboration 
|
|-
| style="text-align:center;"|Best Editing
|
|-
| style="text-align:center;"|2017
| style="text-align:center;"|Herself
| style="text-align:center;"|Michael Jackson Video Vanguard Award
|
|-
| style="text-align:center;"|2018
| style="text-align:center;"|"What About Us"
| style="text-align:center;"|Best Pop
|
|-
| style="text-align:center;"|2021
| style="text-align:center;"|"All I Know So Far"
| style="text-align:center;"|Best Visual Effects
|

MTV Video Music Awards Japan
The MTV Video Music Awards Japan were started in 2002 to celebrate the most popular music videos in Pop, Hip-Hop, Rock culture and many more. Pink has received three awards from four nominations.

|-
| rowspan="2" style="text-align:center;"|2002
| style="text-align:center;"|"Lady Marmalade"
| style="text-align:center;"|Best Video from a Film
|
|-
| style="text-align:center;"|Pink
| style="text-align:center;"|Best Pop Artist
|
|-
| style="text-align:center;"|2004
| style="text-align:center;"|"Feel Good Time"
| style="text-align:center;"|Best Video from a Film
|
|-
| style="text-align:center;"|2010
| style="text-align:center;"|"Please Don't Leave Me"
| style="text-align:center;"|Best Pop Video
|
|-
| style="text-align:center;"|2013
| style="text-align:center;"|"Try"
| style="text-align:center;"|Best Choreography
|

Music Video Production Awards
The MVPA Awards are annually presented by a Los Angeles-based music trade organization to honor the year's best music videos.

! scope="col" |
|-
| rowspan="2" | 2006
| rowspan="2" | "Stupid Girls"
| Best Make-Up
| 
| rowspan="2" |
|-
| rowspan="2" | Best Hair 
| 
|-
| rowspan="3" | 2013
| rowspan="2" | "Try"
| 
| rowspan="3" |
|-
| Best Pop Video
| 
|-
| "Just Give Me a Reason"
| Best Editing 
|

Much Music Video Awards
The MuchMusic Video Awards (also known as (the) MMVA or MMVAs) are annual awards presented by the Canadian music video channel MuchMusic to honour the year's best music videos.
 

! scope="col" |
|-
| style="text-align:center;"|2006
| style="text-align:center;"|"Stupid Girls"
| style="text-align:center;"| Best International Video- Artist
|
| style="text-align:center;"|
|-
| style="text-align:center;"|2011
| style="text-align:center;"|"Raise Your Glass"
| style="text-align:center;"| MuchMusic.com Most Watched Video
|
| style="text-align:center;"|
|-
| style="text-align:center;" rowspan="2"|2013
| style="text-align:center;"|"Try"
| style="text-align:center;"| International Video of the Year- Artist
|
| style="text-align:center;" rowspan="2"|
|-
| style="text-align:center;"|Pink
| style="text-align:center;"| Your Fave International Artist/Group
|

Nickelodeon Kids' Choice Awards
The Nickelodeon Kids' Choice Awards, also known as the KCAs, is an annual awards show, which airs live and is usually held in late March or early April, that honors the year's biggest television, movie, and music acts. Pink has received two awards from three nominations.

	
|-
| style="text-align:center;"|2001
| style="text-align:center;"|Pink
| style="text-align:center;"|Favorite Female Artist
|
|-
| rowspan="2" style="text-align:center;"|2002
| style="text-align:center;"|Pink
| style="text-align:center;"|Favorite Female Artist
|	
|-
| style="text-align:center;"|"Get the Party Started"	
| style="text-align:center;"|Favorite Song
|
|-
| style="text-align:center;"|2003
| rowspan="3" style="text-align:center;"|Pink
| style="text-align:center;"|Favorite Female Artist
|
|-
| style="text-align:center;"|2013
| style="text-align:center;"|Favorite Female Artist
|
|-
| style="text-align:center;"|2018
| style="text-align:center;"|Favorite Female Artist
|

Nickelodeon Australian Kids' Choice Awards
The Nickelodeon Australian Kids' Choice Awards is an annual awards show which commends entertainers, voted by children aged 12–19. Pink has received two awards from three nominations.KCA 2009 website
 
	
|-
| style="text-align:center;"|2007
| rowspan="3" style="text-align:center;"|Pink
| rowspan="3" style="text-align:center;"|Fave International Singer
|	
|-
| style="text-align:center;"|2008
|
|-
| style="text-align:center;"|2009
|

NME Awards
The NME Awards were created by the NME magazine and was first held in 1953. Pink has received four nominations.

! scope="col" |
|-
| rowspan="3" | 2003
| rowspan="4" | Pink 
| Worst Haircut 
| 
| rowspan="3" |
|-
| Artist of the Year
| 
|-
| rowspan="2" | Best Solo Artist 
| 
|-
| 2004
| 
|

NRJ Music Awards
The NRJ Music Awards, created in 2000 by the radio station NRJ in partnership with the television network TF1 takes place every year in mid-January at Cannes (PACA, France). Pink has received one award from ten nominations.

! scope="col" |
|-
| rowspan="2" style="text-align:center;"|2003
| rowspan="3" style="text-align:center;"|Pink
| style="text-align:center;"|Music Website of the Year
|
| rowspan="2" style="text-align:center;"|
|-
| style="text-align:center;"| International New Artist of the Year
|
|-
| style="text-align:center;"|2004
| style="text-align:center;"| Best International Female Artist
|
|
|-
| rowspan="2" style="text-align:center;"|2007
| style="text-align:center;"| "Stupid Girls"
| style="text-align:center;"|Video of the Year
|
| rowspan="2" style="text-align:center;"|
|-
| rowspan="2" style="text-align:center;"|Pink
| rowspan="2" style="text-align:center;"|Best International Female Artist
|
|-
| rowspan="2" style="text-align:center;"|2009
|
| rowspan="2" style="text-align:center;"|
|-
| style="text-align:center;"|Funhouse
| style="text-align:center;"|Best International Album
|
|-
| style="text-align:center;"|2011
| rowspan="6" style="text-align:center;"|Pink
| rowspan="6" style="text-align:center;"|Best International Female Artist
|
| style="text-align:center;"|
|-
| style="text-align:center;"|2013
|
| style="text-align:center;"|
|-
| style="text-align:center;"|2014
|
| style="text-align:center;"|
|-
| style="text-align:center;"|2017
|
| style="text-align:center;"|
|-
| style="text-align:center;"|2018
|
| style="text-align:center;"|
|-
| style="text-align:center;"|2019
|
| style="text-align:center;"|

People's Choice Awards
The People's Choice Awards is an awards show recognizing the people and the work of popular culture. Since 1975, the program has been held annually, and viewers vote for the winners. Pink has received 12 nominations, with one victory.
 

|-
| style="text-align:center;"|2006
| style="text-align:center;"|"Stupid Girls"
| style="text-align:center;"|Favorite Pop Song
|
|-
| style="text-align:center;"|2010
| rowspan="6" style="text-align:center;"|Pink
| style="text-align:center;"|Favorite Female Artist
|
|-
| rowspan="2" style="text-align:center;"|2011
| style="text-align:center;"|Favorite Female Artist
|
|-
| style="text-align:center;"|Favorite Pop Artist
|
|-
| rowspan="2" style="text-align:center;"|2013
| style="text-align:center;"|Favorite Female Artist
| 
|-
| style="text-align:center;"|Favorite Pop Artist
|  
|-
| rowspan="3" style="text-align:center;"|2014
| style="text-align:center;"|Favorite Female Artist
|
|-
| rowspan="2" style="text-align:center;"|"Just Give Me a Reason" (featuring Nate Ruess)
| style="text-align:center;"|Favorite Music Video
|
|-
| style="text-align:center;"|Favorite Song
|
|-
| rowspan="3" style="text-align:center;"|2019
| rowspan="2" style="text-align:center;"|Pink
| style="text-align:center;"|The Female Artist of 2019
|
|-
| style="text-align:center;"|People's Champion Award
|
|-
| style="text-align:center;"|Beautiful Trauma World Tour
| style="text-align:center;"|The Concert Tour of 2019
|

Pollstar Awards
The Pollstar Concert Industry Awards aim to reward the best in the business of shows and concerts. Pink has received two award from three nominations.

!
|-
!scope="row"|2007
|Pink and Justin Timberlake
|Most Creative Tour Package
|
|style="text-align:center;"|
|-
!scope="row" rowspan="2"|2013
|rowspan="2"|Pink
|Major Tour of the Year
|
|rowspan="2" style="text-align:center;"|
|-
|Most Creative Stage Production
|
|-
! scope="row"|2018
|rowspan="3"|Beautiful Trauma World Tour
|rowspan="2"|Best Pop Tour
|
| style="text-align:center;"|
|-
!scope="row" rowspan="2"|2019
|
|rowspan="2" style="text-align:center;"|
|-
|Major Tour of the Year
|

Pop Awards
The Pop Awards are presented annually by Pop Magazine, honoring the best in popular music. Pink has been nominated one time.

!	
|-
| 2018
| "What About Us"
| Song Of The Year Award
| 
|style="text-align:center;"|
|}

Q Awards
Pink received one award from one nomination.

! scope="col" |
|-
| style="text-align:center;"|2002
| style="text-align:center;"|Get The Party Started
| style="text-align:center;"|Best Video
|
|

Radio Music Awards

Satellite Awards
The Satellite Awards are annual awards given by the International Press Academy that are commonly noted in entertainment industry journals and blogs. The awards were originally known as the Golden Satellite Awards. The award ceremonies take place each year at the InterContinental Hotel in Century City, Los Angeles.

|-
| style="text-align:center;"|2011
| style="text-align:center;"|"Bridge of Light"
| style="text-align:center;"|Best Original Song
|

Smash Hits Poll Winners Party
Pink received one award from one nomination.

! scope="col" |
|-
| style="text-align:center;"| 2002
| Pink
| Best Female Solo 
| 
|
|-

Swiss Music Awards
The Swiss Music Awards are held by IFPI Switzerland, SUISA, Swissperform and the Swiss Music Pedagogic Association. Pink received one award from one nomination.

|-
| style="text-align:center;"|2010
| style="text-align:center;"|Funhouse
| style="text-align:center;"|Best Pop/Rock International Album
|

Teen Choice Awards
The Teen Choice Awards is an awards show presented annually by FOX. The program honors the year's biggest achievements in music, movies, sports, television, fashion and more, as voted on by teens aged 13–19. Pink has received one award from seven nominations.

|-
| rowspan="3" style="text-align:center;"|2001
| rowspan="2" style="text-align:center;"|"Lady Marmalade"
| style="text-align:center;"|Song of the Summer
|
|-
| style="text-align:center;"|Choice Music: Dance Track
|
|-
| rowspan="2" style="text-align:center;"|Pink
| rowspan="2" style="text-align:center;"|Choice Female Artist
|
|-
| rowspan="3" style="text-align:center;"|2002
|
|-
| style="text-align:center;"|Missundaztood
| style="text-align:center;"|Choice Music: Album
|
|-
| style="text-align:center;"|"Get the Party Started"
| style="text-align:center;"|Choice Music – Single
|
|-
| style="text-align:center;"|2003
| style="text-align:center;"|Pink
| style="text-align:center;"|Choice Female Artist
|
|-
| style="text-align:center;"|2007
| style="text-align:center;"|"U + Ur Hand"
| style="text-align:center;"|Payback Track
|
|-
| rowspan="3" style="text-align:center;"|2013
| rowspan="2" style="text-align:center;"|Pink
| style="text-align:center;"|Female Artist
|
|-
| style="text-align:center;"|Summer Music Star: Female
|
|-
| style="text-align:center;"|"Just Give Me a Reason" (featuring Nate Ruess)
| style="text-align:center;"|Choice Love song
|
|-
| rowspan="2" style="text-align:center;"|2016
| style="text-align:center;"|Pink
| style="text-align:center;"|Choice Summer Music Star: Female
|
|-
| style="text-align:center;"|"Just Like Fire" 
| style="text-align:center;"|Choice Music: Song from a Movie of TV Show
|

The Music Factory Awards

TMF Awards

TMF Awards — Belgium

|-
| style="text-align:center;"| 2001 || "Lady Marmalade" || Best Video of the Year || 
|-

TMF Awards — Nederland

|-
| style="text-align:center;"| 2002
| "Lady Marmalade" 
|rowspan=2 |Best Video of the Year 
| 
|-
| style="text-align:center;"| 2006
| "Stupid Girls" 
| 
|-

UK Music Video Awards

! scope="col" |
|-
| style="text-align:center;"| 2017 || "What About Us" || Best Choreography in a Video || 
|
|-

My VH1 Music Awards

{| class="wikitable plainrowheaders" style="width:85%;"
|-
! scope="col" style="width:4%;"| Year
! scope="col" style="width:35%;"| Nominated work
! scope="col" style="width:50%;"| Category
! scope="col" style="width:6%;"| Result
! scope="col" style="width:6%;"| 
|-
| rowspan="3" style="text-align:center;"| 2001 || rowspan="3" |"Lady Marmalade" || Is It Hot in Here Or Is It Just My Video ||  || rowspan="3"|
|-
| My Favorite Video ||  
|-
| There's No "I" In Team (Best Collaboration) ||

World Music Awards
The World Music Awards is an international awards show founded in 1989 that annually honors recording artists based on worldwide sales figures provided by the International Federation of the Phonographic Industry (IFPI). Pink has received two awards from three nominations.
 

! scope="col" |
|-
| style="text-align:center;"|2003
| rowspan="4" style="text-align:center;"|Pink
| style="text-align:center;"|World Best Selling American Pop Female Artist	
|
| style="text-align:center;"|
|-
| style="text-align:center;"|2006
| style="text-align:center;"|World's Best Selling Pop/Rock Artist
|
| style="text-align:center;"|
|-
| style="text-align:center;"|2007
| style="text-align:center;"|World's Best Selling Pop/Rock Artist
|
| style="text-align:center;"|
|-
| style="text-align:center;"|2008
| style="text-align:center;"|World's Best Selling Pop/Rock Artist
|
| style="text-align:center;"|

4Music Video Honours

! scope="col" |
|-
| rowspan="2" style="text-align:center;"|2012
| style="text-align:center;"|Pink
| style="text-align:center;"|Best Girl	
|
| rowspan="2" style="text-align:center;"| 
|-
| style="text-align:center;"|"Blow Me (One Last Kiss)"
| style="text-align:center;"|Best Video	
|
|-

Žebřík Music Awards

!Ref.
|-
| rowspan=2|2002
| "Just Like a Pill"
| Best International Song
| 
| rowspan=3|
|-
| rowspan=4|Pink
| rowspan=4|Best International Female
| 
|-
| 2003
| 
|-
| 2004
| 
| rowspan=2|
|-
| 2005
|

References

Pink
Awards